26 Tay Street is an historic building in Perth, Scotland. Designed by local architect Andrew Heiton, the building is Category B listed, dating to around 1873. Standing on Tay Street, between St Matthew's Church to the south and the Perth and Kinross Council offices at 2 High Street to the north, the building is currently the home of The Capital Asset, a J D Wetherspoons establishment.

The building was formerly the home of Perth Savings Bank, which is when the building was extended, to a design by Robert Matthew Mitchell.

See also
List of listed buildings in Perth, Scotland

References

External links
The building in 2009 – Google Street View

1873 establishments in Scotland
Tay Street, 26
Category B listed buildings in Perth and Kinross